Claret is an English name for red Bordeaux wine.

Claret may also refer to:

Claret (color), a deep shade of red
Claret (surname)
The Claret School, a private Catholic all-boys school.
Operation Claret, a series of raids during the Indonesia–Malaysia confrontation.
The Claret Jug, a golf trophy.
Claret Ash, a variety of tree.
Australian & British slang for blood, such as from a sports injury
A player or supporter of Burnley F.C., nicknamed the Clarets due to the dominant colour of their team shirts.
Claret is also the name of several communes in France:
 Claret, Alpes-de-Haute-Provence
 Claret, Hérault